Sergeant Uday Singh (1982–2003) was the first U.S. Army soldier of Indian descent to die during Operation Iraqi Freedom. He was born in a Punjabi Sikh Saini family. His death in Iraq was widely reported in the Indian and American media.

Early life

Sergeant Uday Singh was born in India on 23 April 1982. He was born to a distinguished military family. His father is Lt. Col. Preet Mahinder Singh, an Indian Army veteran who was part of the Armoured Corps. His grandfather, Wing Commander Kartar Singh Taunque, was the first member of Indian Air Force to win a gallantry award for operations in Waziristan during Waziristan campaign (1936–39). He lived with his parents at various military stations until 1994. In 1994, he moved to his grandparents' home in Chandigarh.

Education
In Chandigarh, he enrolled in St. Stephen's School, Chandigarh. English was his favourite subject. In 1995, Singh's parents and sister also moved to Chandigarh. Singh, completing school in Chandigarh in June 2000, left for the U.S. with his father and sister.

Service in the U.S. Army
Singh enlisted in the U.S. Army on 28 August 2000 and following completion of initial training at Fort Knox was assigned to Charlie Company, 1st Battalion, 34th Armor Regiment, based at Fort Riley, Kansas.

Singh's unit was deployed to Iraq in September 2003. On, 1 December 2003, Singh was serving as the gunner in the lead Humvee of his platoon while on reconnaissance mission in Habbaniyah. The platoon took fire and Singh returned fire, pinning the insurgents down until reinforcements arrived. Sergeant Singh was shot in the head, just below his helmet, during the engagement and died while en route to the hospital.  The mission led to the capture of a number of insurgents and large cache of weapons.

For his actions that day Uday received the Bronze Star and Purple Heart.

He was buried in Arlington National Cemetery, making him one of the only Sikhs to be buried there.

Memorials
 Illinois General Assembly also paid homage to him by passing a Senate resolution.
 Uday Singh memorial at St. Stephen's School Chandigarh.

See also 
Kartar Singh Taunque
Jagjit Singh Taunque
Indian American
Punjabi American
List of Indian Americans

References 

 
United States Army non-commissioned officers
1982 births
2003 deaths
People from Jaipur
American people of Punjabi descent
American Sikhs
Burials at Arlington National Cemetery
Indian emigrants to the United States
United States Army personnel of the Iraq War
American military personnel killed in the Iraq War